is a Japanese footballer as Defender, who currently play for Shinagawa CC. So far, as of June 2022, in his first 9 years of footballing activity, he signed for clubs in all the 4 national-wide divisions plus the regional-wide Kantō Soccer League.

Career statistics

Club
Updated to the start from 2023 season.

References

External links

Profile at Azul Claro Numazu
Profile at Roasso Kumamoto

1995 births
Living people
Association football people from Fukuoka Prefecture
Japanese footballers
J2 League players
J3 League players
Japan Football League players
Avispa Fukuoka players
AC Nagano Parceiro players
Azul Claro Numazu players
Roasso Kumamoto players
J.League U-22 Selection players
Fujieda MYFC players
Thespakusatsu Gunma players
Vonds Ichihara players
Association football defenders